See also Parbold railway station which was originally named "Newburgh railway station".

There have been several railway stations serving the town of Newburgh, Fife. This station lasted until August 1906, when a larger replacement station was opened.

Newburgh became a junction station on 25 January 1909, when the Newburgh and North Fife Railway company opened a line from Newburgh to Dundee. This route called at Lindores, Luthrie, and Kilmany, and was an attempt to provide a competitive service between Perth and Dundee via the south of the River Tay. The route diverged at a triangle junction just south of St Fort station. This alternative route to Dundee from Perth was not, however, a great success, as journey times were considerably longer.

In July 1933, the line from Newburgh to Bridge of Earn was converted to single track. By this time, the station was in ownership by the London and North Eastern Railway. 
From 1948 the station was under British Railways ownership.  In February 1951, the Newburgh (Glenburnie Junction) to St Fort line closed to passenger services. The station's history continued mainly uneventfully until 19 September 1955 when the station closed to passengers (along with the other intermediate stations between Bridge of Earn and Ladybank), but remained open for goods purposes.

On 13 May 1960, Newburgh (Glenburnie Junction) to Lindores closed completely, and Newburgh to Glenburnie Junction was singled, leaving a single line route between Ladybank and Perth. St Fort to Lindores remained open for freight until October 1964. Newburgh station loop remained intact, however, and in December 1971 was signalled for bi-directional working. This loop and the, by then, decaying Newburgh sidings were both removed in October 1980.

From October 1975, British Rail reopened the line to regular passenger traffic once again, although not calling at the intermediate stations. This was an attempt to provide a shorter alternative route between Edinburgh & Perth to the existing one via Stirling (the old direct line through Kinross via  and Glenfarg having closed in January 1970), as well as to provide connections between Perth and Edinburgh without the need to change trains.

Today the station lies derelict - the platform and main building are both still intact, although gutted of all furnishings. It has been suggested many times that the station should be re-opened, along with Abernethy and Bridge of Earn, as these places have slowly been developing over the past 25 years. The line from Ladybank to Perth forms part of the Edinburgh to Inverness Line.

For now, though, the train service is replaced permanently by a bus, and to operate stopping services on the line may require loops in certain places (possibly even redoubling, as the line is already heavily used by  / Perth -  services). Occasionally, freight, London-bound trains and the Caledonian Sleeper services use this line if the route via Stirling is closed for maintenance. A few railtours have also been known to traverse the Newburgh line.

References

External links
 Railscot - Photographs of Newburgh
 "The Newburgh Train Station Campaign" - Campaign to reopen the station

Disused railway stations in Fife
Former North British Railway stations
Railway stations in Great Britain opened in 1848
Railway stations in Great Britain closed in 1955
1848 establishments in Scotland
1955 disestablishments in Scotland